Chott el Fejej, also known as Chott el Fedjedj and Chott el Fejaj, is a long, narrow inlet of the endorheic salt lake Chott el Djerid in southern Tunisia.

History and geography
The bottom of Chott el Fejej lies below sea level and runs in a narrow path from the main body of Chott el Djerid to the Tunisian desert oasis of El Hamma, near the Gulf of Gabès on the Mediterranean Sea. Along its length, Chott el Fejej never widens beyond  and in many places is considerably more narrow.

It was this narrow sandy ridge, separating the Chott el Fejej from the Mediterranean Sea, which brought it to the attention of various geographers, engineers and diplomats. These figures looked to create an inland "Sahara Sea" by channelling the waters of the Mediterranean into Sahara Desert basins which lay below sea level. A noted proposal to this effect was put forward in the late 1800s by French geographer François Élie Roudaire and the creator of the Suez Canal, Ferdinand de Lesseps, but stalled after the French government withdrew funding. Later proposals, made as part of Operation Plowshare, posited that nuclear explosives could be used to dig the proposed canal from the Mediterranean to the Chott el Fejej and other below-sea-level basins of the Sahara; these proposals were also fruitless.

Geology
The Chott el Fejej is a typical chott, or dry lake, of the Sahara. It is underlain, however, by a major anticline known as the Fejej Dome. This anticline and other surrounding structures are argued to be the result of rifting in the Cretaceous period.

References

Lakes of Tunisia
Endorheic lakes of Africa
Kebili Governorate
Gabès Governorate